John Markie (born 16 December 1944) is a Scottish former footballer, who played as a central defender.

Markie played for Newcastle United, Falkirk, Clyde and Stenhousemuir.

References

1944 births
Living people
People from Bo'ness
Association football central defenders
Scottish footballers
Newcastle United F.C. players
Falkirk F.C. players
Clyde F.C. players
Stenhousemuir F.C. players
English Football League players
Scottish Football League players